The 1866 Open Championship was the seventh Open Championship and was held on 13 September at Prestwick Golf Club. Willie Park, Sr. won the championship for the third time, by two shots from his brother Davie Park. There were 16 competitors.

Played in a strong wind Willie Park was in the first group out and set the pace with a score of 54. Defending champion, Andrew Strath and Davie Park were four behind, scoring 58. Willie Park extended his lead to five stokes after the second round. Despite a final round of 59 Willie Park set a useful target of 169. Davie Park's final round of 56 gave him a total of 171 and second place. Robert Andrew was third, a further five strokes behind.

Final leaderboard
Source:

Thursday, 13 September 1866

References

External links
Prestwick 1866 (Official site)

The Open Championship
Golf tournaments in Scotland
Open Championship
Open Championship
Open Championship